Widespread Panic is an American rock band from Athens, Georgia. The current lineup includes guitarist/singer John Bell, bassist Dave Schools, drummer Duane Trucks, percussionist Domingo "Sunny" Ortiz, keyboardist John "JoJo" Hermann, and guitarist Jimmy Herring. The band's original guitarist and sometime songwriter, Michael Houser, died of pancreatic cancer in 2002, and the original drummer, Todd Nance, left in 2016 and died in 2020.

The band was formed in Athens, Georgia, in 1986, and is influenced by the Southern rock, blues-rock, progressive rock, funk and hard rock genres. They have been compared to other jam bands such as the Grateful Dead and Phish. Widely renowned for their live performances, they have held the record for number of sold-out performances at Red Rocks Amphitheatre (Morrison, Colorado) and State Farm Arena (Atlanta).

Band history

1981–1995: Early years and rise to national attention
John Bell and Michael Houser met in 1981 in their dorm at the University of Georgia. Bell had been playing guitar as a solo act, and invited his new friend Houser, also a guitarist, to join him. They began living together and collaborating on music in that year, writing still-popular songs such as "Driving Song" and "Chilly Water" together. Bassist Dave Schools met Bell and Houser in 1984 and first played with them on February 24, 1985, at the A-Frame house on Weymanda Court in Athens. On February 6, 1986, Houser called childhood friend and drummer Todd Nance to sit in with Houser, Bell, and Schools for a charity event in Athens; it was their first show as "Widespread Panic." The band was named for Houser's once-frequent panic attacks. Texan percussionist Domingo S. Ortiz ("Sunny") began sitting in with the band regularly later that year.

The band played in fraternities and bars regularly before Panic signed a contract with Landslide Records in 1987. In February 1987 the band played the now-legendary series of one dollar Monday night shows at the Uptown Lounge in Athens and the crucial local press began to take notice—FLAGPOLE & Athens Observer art columnist Shan Clark emphasized Widespread Panic's musical virtuosity, songwriting and professionalism. In September of the same year, they recorded their first album, Space Wrangler, at John Keane's studio in Athens. Col. Bruce Hampton is rumored to have delivered the first pressing to the band. Songs on the album included "Chilly Water", "Travelin' Light", "Space Wrangler", "Coconut", "The Take Out", "Porch Song", "Stop-Go" and "Driving Song." After Space Wrangler, touring expanded to include additional northeastern dates, along with Texas, Colorado, the west coast, and internationally to Vancouver, Canada. It was also around this time (late 1988 or early 1989) that Domingo Ortiz joined the band full-time. They played their first show in Colorado in March 1990, opening for Jerry Joseph's band Little Women.

Widespread Panic signed with Capricorn Records in January 1991. Later that year, they released their major label debut, Widespread Panic (a.k.a. Mom's Kitchen). That same year Billy Bob Thornton directed the movie Widespread Panic: Live from the Georgia Theatre which was recorded over two nights in Athens, Georgia.

As the band began to tour more, John Hermann ("JoJo") joined the band as a keyboardist in March 1992 replacing Dixie Dregs keyboardist T. Lavitz who joined the band a year earlier. The band continued to tour throughout the entire US in 1992 joining the famous H.O.R.D.E. tour with Blues Traveler, Phish, and the Aquarium Rescue Unit, among others. They released Everyday in March 1993 and Ain't Life Grand in September 1994. Panic marked their rise by playing on network television for the first time in November 1994.

1996–2002: Peak touring years and Houser's death

On April 18, 1998, to celebrate the release of their first live album, Light Fuse, Get Away, Widespread Panic offered a free "CD release party" concert in Athens Georgia. An estimated 80,000–100,000 fans descended on the town, transforming it into one of the largest CD release parties in history.

In 2002, the band received gold certification for their concert DVD Live at Oak Mountain. They also headlined two nights of the first annual Bonnaroo Music Festival which drew a crowd upwards of 70,000 people.

In early 2002, guitarist Michael Houser was diagnosed with pancreatic cancer. Houser continued to perform with the band into the middle of that year, but following a performance on July 2, 2002 in Cedar Rapids, Iowa he left the tour because of his declining health. Guitarist George McConnell, a former bandmate of JoJo Hermann's in Beanland, took over as lead guitarist for the remainder of the band's scheduled dates. Michael Houser died on August 10, 2002.

2003–2006: George McConnell joins
In 2003, the band released Ball, the first studio album with McConnell as the guitarist. The album was unique among the band's offerings in that none of the songs included had been performed live by the band prior to the recording. All of the material included was written specifically for the album with the exception of "Time Waits", a song which John Bell had performed in solo appearances, and "Don't Wanna Lose You", a song John Hermann had performed with his side-project Smiling Assassins. Late in 2003, the band announced that they would be taking a hiatus from both recording and performing in 2004. However, 2004 did see the release of three live albums, engineered by Billy Field: Night of Joy and Über Cobra—both of which were recorded during a November 2003 three-night run of shows at the House of Blues in Myrtle Beach, South Carolina—as well as Jackassolantern, a compilation of cover songs performed during the band's Halloween shows over the years.  A third release from the Myrtle Beach shows, Live at Myrtle Beach was released in early 2005.

In January 2006, the band recorded their 9th studio album, Earth to America, in Nassau, Bahamas at Compass Point Studios, with Terry Manning producing. It was released June 13, 2006. Their May 9 show at Atlanta's Fox Theatre was simulcast in LIVE HD, via satellite, in select movie theatres nationwide. Over 60,000 fans across the country watched it live in the theatres. This show was also released in DVD format on November 14, 2006, entitled Earth to Atlanta.

On August 2, 2006, nearing the end of the summer tour, the band announced that George McConnell had left the band, making July 30, 2006 at the Fox Theater in St. Louis, his last show. Producer John Keane and former guitar technician Sam Holt filled in on guitar for the remaining two weeks of the tour.

2006–2014: Jimmy Herring joins

In late 2006, Fayetteville, North Carolina native Jimmy Herring joined the band in the role of lead guitarist. His first shows started their fall tour with three nights at Radio City Music Hall in New York City.

Panic's 7th annual New Year's shows on December 30 and 31, 2007, marked their 15th and 16th sellout performance at Philips Arena.

The band released their 10th album, Free Somehow, on February 12, 2008. It, too, was recorded with producer Terry Manning at Compass Point Studios.

Following the release of the new studio album, Widespread Panic began to release vintage concert performances from the Widespread Panic Archives. Carbondale 2000 was released on June 10, 2008, followed by Valdosta 1989 released on February 24, 2009, and Huntsville 1996 released on June 23, 2009. The band will continue to dig into their show archives, which encompasses the past 25 years, and release these shows as multi-track recordings.

June 27, 2008, marked the band's 32nd sold-out show at Red Rocks Amphitheatre. This was more than any other band in the venue's history. Mayor John Hickenlooper proclaimed Friday, June 27 "Widespread Panic Day" in the City and County of Denver.
The same year, Widespread Panic was inducted into the Georgia Music Hall of Fame on September 20.

The band continued to tour throughout the rest of 2008 and the spring of 2009.  In the summer of 2009, Widespread Panic teamed up with fellow southern rockers, The Allman Brothers to do a summer and fall co-headlining tour.

In March 2010, it was announced that Widespread Panic would be releasing a new album entitled Dirty Side Down on May 25, 2010. 2010 would also see the release of Live in the Classic City II, containing music from its 2000 shows.

On September 29, 2010, Widespread keyboardist Jojo Herman announced that the band would be going on hiatus in 2012. In an interview with The Vanderbilt Hustler, Herman explained, "Next year will be our 25th anniversary. After that, we're probably going to call it (quits) for awhile. So we're looking forward to next year and going out on a high note."

The band went on to tour steadily throughout 2011, ending the year with their first show at Time Warner Cable Arena in Charlotte, North Carolina.  In early 2012, the band played a limited number of shows.  From January to February the band embarked on their first ever tour billed as completely acoustic.  Dubbed the Wood Tour, it started in January at the Fillmore in Silver Spring, Maryland and ended at The Belly Up in Aspen, Colorado.  Two recordings from the Wood Tour were released in 2012, a special Record Store Day-only vinyl record entitled Live Wood in April and later Wood, on October 16.

The rest of 2012 saw the band on hiatus but band members were active with other projects.  Dave Schools toured with the Mickey Hart Band, Jimmy Herring recorded a new album and toured with his own band, and Jojo Hermann played shows with the Missing Cats, occasionally opening and sitting in with the North Mississippi Allstars.  On August 17, the band announced their first scheduled shows after hiatus, including two nights in Charlotte, North Carolina and a 4-night run in the Dominican Republic.

Between the two short legs that made up the 2012 Wood Tour, the band played a four night run in Mexico, marking their first shows in the country, and beginning what would become an annual tradition called Panic en la Playa. The first Panic En La Playa was held on the beach at the Now Sapphire Resort in Puerto Morelos, Mexico in 2012. For 2013 and 2014, The concert was held at the Hard Rock Hotel in Punta Cana, Dominican Republic, with the 2014 shows pushed back until March 17–20.

The band returned to regular touring in the spring of 2013 with a run of Mid-West and Southern shows beginning in April. During these shows, the band introduced new innovations in the audio broadcast of their live performance. Previously, Panic had allowed tapers to use audience recording devices to simulcast live shows to fans via the internet. The first live taper stream was at the Dodge Theatre in Phoenix, Arizona on 11/04/2009 by Coloartist and was continued by all the WP tapers through the Spring 2013 tour when the band took over streaming duties and started broadcasting live soundboard recordings of the show via Mixlr.com and the Mixlr smartphone app. On December 31, 2013 the band returned to Philips Arena in Atlanta.

2014 saw a return of Wood Tour, with the band playing six all acoustic theater shows, as well as a special Wood performance held 333 feet underground in the Volcano Room at Cumberland Caverns  in McMinnville, Tennessee for a taping of an episode of PBS' Bluegrass Underground. The band played an extensive 2014 tour, with three-night stands at Red Rocks, The Joint at the Hard Rock Hotel and Casino in Las Vegas, The Riverside Theater in Milwaukee, and 1stBank Center in Broomfield, Colorado, where they played their well-known Halloween shows.

The band closed out 2014 with two shows in Charlotte, North Carolina: the annual Tunes for Tots benefit performance at The Fillmore in Charlotte, North Carolina on 12/30, followed by their annual New Year's Eve show, held this particular year at the TWC Arena in Charlotte, North Carolina.

2014–present:  Todd Nance departure, reduced touring and Nance's death
On October 2, 2014, the band announced that Duane Trucks would join the band for 2014 fall tour. Trucks temporarily filled in for Todd Nance, who was taking time to attend to personal matters. Nance reunited with the band for four shows in Mexico in early February 2016. However, on February 9, 2016, the band announced that Todd Nance was leaving the band and that, "Duane [Trucks] will be the drummer for Widespread Panic moving forward." Trucks is the current drummer for Hard Working Americans.

On September 25, 2015, Street Dogs, their 13th studio album, was released through Vanguard Records. Street Dogs was recorded by John Keane at Echo Mountain Recording Studio in Asheville, North Carolina. The album is composed of seven originals and three covers: Alan Price's "Sell Sell", Murray McLauchlan's "Honky Red" and "Tail Dragger", a Willie Dixon tune popularized by Howlin' Wolf.

In April 2016, keyboardist John Hermann announced that the band will stop touring extensively at the end of the year. However, he said that the band is not breaking up and will continue to make festival appearances and perform shows at select venues such as Red Rocks.

Nance died on August 19, 2020, in Athens, Georgia. He was 57; his death was first announced on Facebook by collaborator Cody Dickinson and was later confirmed by Relix. Details on the chronic illness that led to his death have not been disclosed.

Live shows

Setlists
Known for never playing the same show twice, the band has a show-to-show ritual of choosing the night's setlist. At the beginning of each tour, a member of the band's road crew makes a master list of all the songs the band performs and laminates it. Each night before the show he marks the last three nights' set lists in different colors. The band can see what has been played recently and then decide what songs to play during the first set. They return to the list during setbreak to pick songs for the second set, and likewise, return after the second set for any additional sets if playing more than two, or the encore. This process is explained by the late Garrie Vereen in the DVD The Earth Will Swallow You.

Tapers
Widespread Panic has the policy of allowing any of their fans to tape, trade, and to a limited extent freely distribute their shows. However, anonymous distribution such as P2P and commercial distribution is not permitted. Fans have been taping and trading shows since before they gained national prominence, allowing them to gain their strong national following.

Incidents
A fan was detained by police while experiencing the effects of LSD after leaving a concert in Southaven, Mississippi.  He was then restrained and taken to a local hospital emergency room where he later died.  He was still in police custody at the time. On November 18, 2015 autopsy findings stated that 'hogtying' contributed to the death of the fan.

Members

Current members
John Bell – lead vocals, guitar (1986–present)
Dave Schools – bass, vocals (1986–present)
Domingo S. Ortiz – percussion (1988–present, frequent live/studio guest 1986–1988)
John Hermann – keyboards, vocals (1992–present)
Jimmy Herring – guitar (2006–present)
Duane Trucks – drums (2016–present, touring 2014–2016)

Former members
Todd Nance – drums, vocals (1986–2016; died 2020)
Michael Houser – guitar, vocals (1986–2002; died 2002)
T Lavitz – keyboards (1991–1992; died 2010)
George McConnell – guitar, vocals (2002–2006)

Discography

Videography

Side projects
 In 1996 the band, under the name of brute., recorded Nine High a Pallet with guitarist Vic Chesnutt; in 2002, brute. released a second album, titled Co-Balt.
 Todd Nance has recorded and toured as part of the band Barbara Cue, releasing three albums.
 Dave Schools has recorded and toured as part of the band Stockholm Syndrome, as well as Mickey Hart Band in 2012. Schools and Layng Martine III have released two albums as Slang, The Bellwether Project in 2001 and More Talk About Tonight in 2004.  Schools was also a touring member of Gov't Mule following the death of Allen Woody.
 John Hermann has toured with JoJo's Mardi Gras Band when Widespread Panic took a year break. He has toured with The Smiling Assassins, and is currently playing in a duo called The Missing Cats.
 In 2013 Schools formed Hard Working Americans with Todd Snider, Neal Casal, Chad Staehly and Duane Trucks. The supergroup's self-titled debut album was recorded at Bob Weir's TRI Studios and mixed by John Keane. It was released on January 21, 2014.

Charity and benefit work

References

External links

 
 Everyday Companion Online
 Rocky Mountain News article
 Dave Schools sits down with Ira Haberman of The Sound Podcast for a feature interview

Rock music groups from Georgia (U.S. state)
Jam bands
American southern rock musical groups
Musical groups from Athens, Georgia
Musical groups established in 1986
1986 establishments in Georgia (U.S. state)
Capricorn Records artists
ATO Records artists
Sanctuary Records artists
Vanguard Records artists